Vanessa Vélez (born 29 August 1989 Ciales, Puerto Rico) is a Puerto Rican female volleyball player. She is a member of the Puerto Rico women's national volleyball team.
She was part of the Puerto Rican National Team at the 2014 FIVB Volleyball Women's World Championship in Italy, and 2014 Women's Pan-American Volleyball Cup.

Clubs
  Gigantes de Carolina (2014–2015) 
  Valencianas de Juncos (2021)

Notes

External links 
FIVB profile

1989 births
Living people
Puerto Rican women's volleyball players
Place of birth missing (living people)
People from Ciales, Puerto Rico
Gigantes de Carolina players